Neuronal cell adhesion molecule is a protein that in humans is encoded by the NRCAM gene.

Cell adhesion molecules (CAMs) are members of the immunoglobulin superfamily. This gene encodes a neuronal cell adhesion molecule with multiple immunoglobulin-like C2-type domains and fibronectin type-III domains. This ankyrin-binding protein is involved in neuron-neuron adhesion and promotes directional signaling during axonal cone growth. This gene is also expressed in non-neural tissues and may play a general role in cell-cell communication via signaling from its intracellular domain to the actin cytoskeleton during directional cell migration. Allelic variants of this gene have been associated with autism and addiction vulnerability. Alternative splicing results in multiple transcript variants encoding different isoforms.

References

Further reading